Thiruchitrambalam is a 2022 Indian Tamil-language romantic comedy drama film written and directed by Mithran R. Jawahar and produced by Kalanidhi Maran of Sun Pictures. The film stars Dhanush, Nithya Menen, Bharathiraja, Prakash Raj, Raashii Khanna and Priya Bhavani Shankar. The soundtrack is composed by Anirudh Ravichander, with cinematography by Om Prakash and editing by Prasanna GK.

The film's title was announced on 5 August 2021, along with principal photography for the film which began with a pooja ceremony in Chennai. Filming wrapped in early-October 2021. Post-production works began on 14 February 2022. Thiruchitrambalam was released theatrically on 18 August 2022, to generally positive reviews from critics and audience, who praised the performances of Dhanush and Menen, soundtrack, direction, storyline and screenplay, and went on to become the highest-grossing film in Dhanush's career.

Plot 
Thiruchitrambalam alias shortly "Pazham" is a delivery agent, in a food delivery company, who lives with his strict father Inspector Neelakandan and paternal grandfather whose name is also Thiruchitrambalam. His mother and sister died in an accident, because of his father's negligence. Unable to forgive his father, Pazham avoids talking to him even though they live under the same roof. His only comfort is his childhood friend Shobana with whom he opens up to. As Pazham navigates through his life, he ends up falling for his childhood crush Anusha. As an immature man, he seeks help to Shobana and she gives ideas to propose his love to Anusha.

On a date, Pazham confesses his feelings to her, but she rejects and apologises to him for flirting and leading him to think that she has a romantic interest in him.

Pazham reconciles with Neelakandan after the latter suffers a stroke, and they leave for his mother's village for a wedding along with Shobhana. Pazham meets Ranjani at the wedding and falls for her. Pazham again
seeks help from Shobana. Shobhana arranges a meet-up between them, few minutes before they leave for Chennai. Pazham asks Ranjini for her phone number but she scoffs at his request saying they are both strangers and have no reason to be in contact which leaves Pazham embarrassed. On his way back home, Pazham laments his bad luck in finding love with his grandfather Sr. Thiruchitrambalam, who asks Pazham to rethink his relationship with Shobana.

Pazham, who saw Shobana as his friend until then, starts developing a romantic interest in her. Pazham confesses his feelings to Shobana, but Shobhana rejects him. This causes awkwardness and strain in their relationship and they both stop talking to each other for a while. Shobana decides to leave for Canada for work and tells Pazham to meet her at the airport. On his way to the airport, Pazham's vehicle is stopped by the police and Shobana gets on the flight. Pazham regrets spoiling his relationship with Shobana, only to learn later through Shobana's brother that she has been loving Pazham, who has been ignoring her feelings for years since 6th grade and that she has treasured letters and gifts from him over the years. He further tells Pazham that she rejected him because she doesn't want to be in a rebound relationship. Since Pazham asked all his doubts on Love and proposals many times Shobana stopped thinking about Thiruchitrambalam.

One month passes by and Pazham calls Shobana, where she tells him that she hates Canada and wants to return back to India. In a twist of events, Pazham tells her to turn back, and she is shocked to see him there. Pazham apologises for ignoring her feelings and being selfish for not asking about her feelings all these years and Pazham rekindles their relationship .They return to India and finally get married.

Cast

Production

Development 
In December 2019, the film production studio Sun Pictures, headed by Kalanithi Maran, announced a new project with Dhanush. The film marked Dhanush's first active project as a producer, as Sun Pictures had earlier distributed Padikkadavan (2009), Aadukalam and Mappillai (2011). Mithran R. Jawahar, who earlier directed Yaaradi Nee Mohini (2008), Kutty and Uthamaputhiran (2010), with Dhanush in the lead was rumoured to direct the film, while his involvement was being undisclosed. Anirudh Ravichander was announced as the film's music composer in October 2020. The film's title Thiruchitrambalam was announced on 5 August 2021.

Casting 
Nithya Menen got 2-3 offers to act with Dhanush before Thiruchitrambalam including for Aadukalam but she could not do that for other reasons. Dhanush also planned to direct a film in 2018 which would have Menen collaborating with him, but again that project did not materialise. While writing the script for Thiruchtrambalam, Dhanush had Menen in mind for the lead role. Finally, in 2020 she was confirmed as the main female lead as Dhanush's friend character Shobhana. Later Raashii Khanna and Priya Bhavani Shankar was announced to play supporting roles along with Prakash Raj and Bharathiraja.

Filming 
Principal photography began with a pooja ceremony in Chennai on 5 August 2021. On 10 August, Prakash Raj took a short break for surgery after he fractured his shoulder during the shooting. Raashii Khanna joined the film's sets in Chennai on 25 August. The crew went to film the song sequences in Pondicherry after the Chennai schedule being completed. In late-August, stills from the film, featuring Dhanush and Khanna, were leaked and went viral on internet. In September, a song shoot featuring Dhanush and Menen was choreographed by Jani Master and filmed in the outskirts of Pondicherry. Stills from the song shoot were leaked onto the internet. The film's shooting, which took place for 50 days, has been completed in early-October 2021. On 14 February 2022, it was announced that dubbing for the film has begun. The film was shot in the 1.85:1 aspect ratio.

Music 

The songs and original score are composed by Anirudh Ravichander, reuniting with Dhanush after six years since their last film, Thanga Magan (2015). It marks Anirudh's fifth collaboration with Dhanush and his first with Mithran Jawahar.

Release

Theatrical 
The film was released worldwide theatrically on 18 August 2022. It is Dhanush's first theatrical release since Karnan (2021) as Jagame Thandhiram (2021), Atrangi Re (2021), Maaran (2022) and The Gray Man (2022) were assigned direct-to-streaming releases.

Home media 
The satellite rights were sold to Sun TV and the streaming rights were bought by Sun NXT. The film began streaming on Sun NXT from 23 September 2022. The film was premiered on Sun TV on 15 January 2023 on the occasion of Pongal.

Reception

Box office 
On the first day of its release, the film earned over 9 crore on its opening day, and grossed over 6 crore in Tamil Nadu. On the second day of its release the film crossed over 20 crores at the box office. On the third day of its release, the film has collected over 32.97 crore in its box office. On its opening weekend, the film grossed over
50 crore. On the tenth day of its release, the film grossed over 64.72 crores in Tamil Nadu. On the thirteenth day of its release the film crossed the 100 crore mark worldwide. On the fifteenth day of its release, the film grossed over 110 crores worldwide and became one of the highest-grossing Tamil films of the year. On the other hand, Pinkvilla stated that the film made 83 crore worldwide during the same period. According to them, the film grossed 94.25 crore in 18 days to become Dhanush's highest earning film worldwide, beating his previous best Raanjhanaa (2013).

Critical response 
Thiruchitrambalam received positive reviews from critics. Haricharan Pudipeddi of Hindustan Times called Thiruchitrambalam a "simple film with its heart at the right place", going on to add that the "simplistic storytelling along with the highly-relatable characters make the film endearing and wholesome", while praising Nithya Menen as "phenomenal". Kirubhakar Purushothaman of The Indian Express gave the film 4 out of 5 stars, stating that "Thiruchitramabalam treats you to an extreme close-up of everyday people and their everyday problems. It is also a gentle reminder that you don't need a lot of guns to blow the audiences' minds." Srivatsan S of The Hindu stated after reviewing the film that "Thiruchitrabalam is also that rom-com where you almost get an airport climax." Janani K of India Today gave 3.5 out of 5 stars and wrote that "Thiruchitrambalam is a fun entertainer that makes you enjoy the everyday things that we usually miss out on." M Suganth of The Times of India gave the film's rating 3.5 out of 5 and stated that "Even the airport climax gets a modern spin that makes it agreeable. But the detour to the protagonist's village doesn't really lend anything extra to the story. We get a few more characters who are also nice people, and that's just it. But the film's director Mithras Jawahar makes up for it with the heartwarming climax."

Ranjini Krishnakumar of News9Live gave 3.5 out of 5 stars, stating that "This endearment for Pazham that the film evokes is not entirely written in. A good part of it is, in fact, Dhanush, who moves us with his boy-next-door charm." Bhavana Sharma of Pinkvilla gave the film's rating 3 out of 5, stating that "Thiruchitrambalam is worth watching for all the right reasons, and especially for Dhanush and Nithya Menen." Sowmya Rajendran of The News Minute gave 4 out of 5 stars, stating that "What a relief to see such a simple, well-told story in Tamil cinema after so long! Nourishing and no fuss, just like a pazham." Sudhir Srinivasan of Cinema Express gave the film 3 out of 5 stars and stated that "It's tragic really when a film, on the cusp of excellence, makes a dated choice that ends up leaving a sour aftertaste." Soundarya Athimuthu of The Quint gave the film's rating 4.5 out of 5, stating that "With impactful dialogues, the film eases out the unnecessary guilt that senior citizens and people with disabilities usually feel and treats them with dignity." Outlook rated the film 3.5 out of 5 stars and stated that "In all, 'Thiruchitrambalam' is an entertainer and a full-fledged one at that!" Karthik Kelamalu of Firstpost gave the film's rating 3.5 out of 5 and stated that "For a director who's mostly made remakes (Yaaradi Nee Mohini, 2008; Uthamaputhiran, 2010), the richness of Thiruchitrambalam will surely yield fresh fruits". Suhasini Srihari of Deccan Herald gave the film's rating 4 out of 5 and stated that "'Thiruchitrambalam' is a narrative that comes afresh with newer ways of telling an old story. Ananda Vikatan rated the film 44 out of 100.

References

External links 
 

2020s Tamil-language films
2022 romantic comedy films
Films directed by Mithran R. Jawahar
Films scored by Anirudh Ravichander
Indian romantic comedy films
Sun Pictures films